Brock Landers may refer to:

 A character portrayed by protagonist Dirk Diggler in the 1997 film Boogie Nights
 A song by The Tyde from their 2006 album Three's Co.
 A pen name used by American politician Ben Quayle